David Royston Bailey  (born 2 January 1938) is an English photographer and director, most widely known for his fashion photography and portraiture, and role in shaping the image of the Swinging Sixties.

Early life 
David Bailey was born at Whipps Cross University Hospital, Leytonstone,  to Herbert Bailey, a tailor's cutter, and his wife Gladys, a machinist. From the age of three he lived in East Ham.

Bailey developed a love of natural history, and this led him into photography. As he had undiagnosed dyslexia, he experienced problems at school. He attended a private school, Clark's College in Ilford, where he says they taught him less than the more basic council school. As well as dyslexia he also has the motor skill disorder dyspraxia (developmental coordination disorder).

In one school year, he claims he only attended 33 times. He left school on his fifteenth birthday, to become a copy boy at the Fleet Street offices of the Yorkshire Post. He raced through a series of dead end jobs, before his call up for National Service in 1956, serving with the Royal Air Force in Singapore in 1957. The appropriation of his trumpet forced him to consider other creative outlets, and he bought a Rolleiflex camera.

He was demobbed in August 1958, and determined to pursue a career in photography, he bought a Canon rangefinder camera. Unable to obtain a place at the London College of Printing because of his school record, he became a second assistant to David Ollins, in Charlotte Mews. He earned £3 10s (£3.50) a week, and acted as studio dogsbody. He was delighted to be called to an interview with photographer John French.

Professional career

In 1959, Bailey became a photographic assistant at the John French studio, and in May 1960, he was a photographer for John Cole's Studio Five, before being contracted as a fashion photographer for British Vogue magazine later that year. He also undertook a large amount of freelance work.

Along with Terence Donovan and Brian Duffy, Bailey captured and helped create the 'Swinging London' of the 1960s: a culture of fashion and celebrity chic. The three photographers socialised with actors, musicians and royalty, and found themselves elevated to celebrity status. Together, they were the first real celebrity photographers, named by Norman Parkinson "the Black Trinity".

The film Blowup (1966), directed by Michelangelo Antonioni, depicts the life of a London fashion photographer who is played by David Hemmings, whose character was inspired by Bailey. The "Swinging London" scene was aptly reflected in his Box of Pin-Ups (1964): a box of poster-prints of 1960s celebrities including Terence Stamp, The Beatles, Mick Jagger, Jean Shrimpton, P. J. Proby, Cecil Beaton, Rudolf Nureyev and East End gangsters, the Kray twins. The Box was an unusual and unique commercial release.  It reflected the changing status of the photographer that one could sell a collection of prints in this way. Strong objection to the presence of the Krays by fellow photographer, Lord Snowdon, was the major reason no American edition of the "Box" was released, and that a second British edition was not issued. The record sale for a copy of 'Box of Pin-Ups' is reported as "north of £20,000".

At Vogue Bailey was shooting covers within months, and, at the height of his productivity, he shot 800 pages of Vogue editorial in one year. Penelope Tree, a former girlfriend, described him as "the king lion on the Savannah: incredibly attractive, with a dangerous vibe. He was the electricity, the brightest, most powerful, most talented, most energetic force at the magazine".

American Vogues creative director Grace Coddington, then a model herself, said "It was the Sixties, it was a raving time, and Bailey was unbelievably good-looking. He was everything that you wanted him to be – like the Beatles but accessible – and when he went on the market everyone went in. We were all killing ourselves to be his model, although he hooked up with Jean Shrimpton pretty quickly".

Of model Jean Shrimpton, Bailey said: 

Since 1966, Bailey has also directed several television commercials and documentaries. From 1968 to 1971 he directed and produced TV documentaries titled Beaton, Warhol and Visconti. As well as fashion photography, Bailey photographed album sleeve art for musicians including The Rolling Stones and Marianne Faithfull. 

Bailey was hired in 1970 by Island Records' Chris Blackwell to shoot publicity photos of Cat Stevens for his upcoming album Tea for the Tillerman. Stevens, who is now known as Yusuf Islam maintains that he disliked having his photo on the cover of his albums, as had previously been the case, although he allowed Bailey's photographs to be placed on the inner sleeve of the album.

In 1972, rock singer Alice Cooper was photographed by Bailey for Vogue magazine, almost naked apart from a snake. Cooper used Bailey the following year to shoot for the group's chart topping Billion Dollar Babies album. The shoot included a baby wearing shocking eye makeup and, supposedly, one billion dollars in cash requiring the shoot to be under armed guard. In 1976, Bailey published Ritz Newspaper together with David Litchfield. In 1985, Bailey was photographing stars at the Live Aid concert at Wembley Stadium. As he recalled later: "The atmosphere on the day was great. At one point I got a tap on my shoulder and spun round. Suddenly there was a big tongue down my throat! It was Freddie Mercury."

In 1992, Bailey directed the BBC drama Who Dealt? starring Juliet Stevenson, story by Ring Lardner. In 1995 he directed and wrote the South Bank Film The Lady is a Tramp featuring his wife Catherine Bailey. In 1998 he directed a documentary with Ginger Television Production, Models Close Up, commissioned by Channel 4 Television.

In 2012, the BBC made a film of the story of his 1962 New York photoshoot with Jean Shrimpton, entitled We'll Take Manhattan, starring Aneurin Barnard as Bailey.

In October 2013, Bailey took part in Art Wars at the Saatchi Gallery curated by Ben Moore. The artist was issued with a stormtrooper helmet, which he transformed into a work of art. Proceeds went to the Missing Tom Fund set up by Ben Moore to find his brother Tom who has been missing for over ten years. The work was also shown on the Regents Park platform as part of Art Below Regents Park.

In October 2020 Bailey's Memoir "Look Again" in co-operation with author James Fox was published by Macmillan Books a review on his life and work.

Fashion 
Bailey began working with fashion brand Jaeger in the late 1950s when Jean Muir landed the role of designer. After working alongside other fashion photographers such as the late Norman Parkinson, Bailey was officially commissioned by Vogue in 1962.

His first shoot in New York City was of young model Jean Shrimpton, who wore a range of Jaeger and Susan Small clothing, including a camel suit with a green blouse and a suede coat worn with kitten heels. The shoot was titled 'Young Idea Goes West'.

After 53 years Bailey returned to Jaeger to shoot their AW15 campaign. As menswear subject; James Penfold modelled tailored tweed blazers and a camel coat. Also on the shoot was model, philanthropist and film director Elisa Sednaoui along with GQ magazine's most stylish male 2003, Martin Gardner.

Awards
 2001: Commander of the Order of the British Empire, as part of 2001 Queen's Birthday Honours.
 2005: Centenary Medal and Honorary Fellowship (HonFRPS), Royal Photographic Society.
 2016: Lifetime Achievement award, Infinity Awards, International Center of Photography, New York.

Painting and sculpture
Bailey paints and sculpts. Some of his sculptures were shown in London in 2010, and paintings and mixed media works were shown in October 2011.

TV appearances
In the 1970s Bailey lost some equipment in a robbery and replaced it with the new Olympus OM system 
equipment which was substantially smaller and lighter than contemporary competitors' equipment. He then appeared in advertising promoting the Olympus OM-1 35 mm single lens reflex camera. He subsequently appeared in a series of UK TV commercials for the Olympus Trip camera.

Personal life
Bailey has been married four times: in 1960 to Rosemary Bramble; in 1965 to the actress Catherine Deneuve (divorced 1972); in 1975 to American fashion model and writer Marie Helvin; and in 1986 to the model Catherine Dyer (born 20 July 1961), to whom he remains married. He is a long-time vegetarian and refrains from drinking alcohol. Bailey  is an art-lover with a long-held passion for the works of Picasso. His company address is in London; his wife and their photographer son Fenton Fox Bailey are directors. The family maintain a home on Dartmoor, near Plymouth. 

Bailey was diagnosed with vascular dementia in about 2018, but continued to work, and said in 2021 that it was not affecting his work although he only had three months' memory.

Books

 Box of Pin-Ups, 1964
 Goodbye Baby & Amen, 1969, 2017
 Warhol, 1974
 Beady Minces, 1974
 Papua New Guinea, 1975
 Mixed Moments, 1976
 Trouble and Strife, 1980
 Mrs. David Bailey, 1980
 Bailey NW1, 1982
 Black & White Memories, 1983
 Nudes 1981–1984, 1984
 Imagine, 1985
 If We Shadows, 1992
 The Lady is a Tramp, 1995
 Rock & Roll Heroes, 1997
 Archive One, 1999 (also titled The Birth of the Cool for USA)
 Chasing Rainbows, 2001
 Art of Violence, Kate Kray & David Bailey, 2003 (also titled Diamond Geezers)
 Bailey/Rankin Down Under, 2003
 Archive Two: Locations, 2003
 Bailey's Democracy, 2005
 Havana, 2006
 NY JS DB 62, 2007
 Pictures That Mark Can Do, 2007
 Is That So Kid, 2008
 David Bailey: 8 Minutes: Hirst & Bailey, 2009 With Damien Hirst
 EYE, 2009
 Flowers, Skulls, Contacts, 2010
 British Heroes in Afghanistan, 2010
 The David Bailey SUMO, 2019
 "Look Again", 2020

Exhibitions

 National Portrait Gallery 1971
 One Man Retrospective Victoria & Albert Museum 1983
 International Center of Photography (ICP) NY 1984
 Curator "Shots of Style" Victoria & Albert Museum 1985
 Pictures of Sudan for Band Aid at The Institute for Contemporary Arts (ICA) *1985
 Auction at Sotheby's for Live Aid Concert for Band Aid 1985
 Bailey Now! Royal Photographic Society in Bath 1989
 Numerous Exhibitions at Hamiltons Gallery, London. 1989 to now
 Fahey Klein Gallery, Los Angeles 1990
 Camerawork Photogallerie, Berlin. 1997
 Carla Sozzani. Milan. 1997
 A Gallery for Fine Photography, New Orleans. 1998
 Touring exhibition "Birth of the Cool" 1957–1969 & contemporary work
 Barbican Art Gallery, London – 1999
 National Museum of Film, Photography & Television, Bradford. 1999–2000
 Moderna Museet, Stockholm, Sweden. 2000
 City Art Museum, Helsinki, Finland 2000
 Modern Art Museum, The Dean Gallery, National Galleries of Scotland, Edinburgh 2001
 Proud Gallery London Bailey /Rankin Down Under
 Gagosian Gallery. Joint with Damien Hirst "14 Stations of the Cross" 2004
 Gagosian Gallery. Artists by David Bailey. 2004
 Democracy. Faggionato Fine Arts 2005
 Havana. Faggionato Fine Arts 2006
 Pop Art Gagosian London 2007
 Galeria Hilario Galguera Mexico 2007
 National Portrait Gallery – Beatles to Bowie 2009
 Bonhams, London. Pure Sixties Pure Bailey 2010
 Pangolin London. Sculpture + 2010
 The Stockdale Effect, Paul Stolper Gallery, London 2010
 David Bailey's East End. Compressor House, London, 2012.
 David Bailey's East End Faces London February/May 2013
 Bailey's Stardust, National Portrait Gallery, London 2014
 Bailey's Stardust, National Gallery, Edinburgh 2015
 David Bailey Stardust, PAC – Padiglione di Arte Contemporanea, Milano (Italy) 2015

References

External links

 
 
 Liz Walker interviews David Bailey, September 1990
 Text of 1994 interview.
 2000 interview (text and video) 
 2006 CNN interview (text and video)
 David Bailey British Vogue Covers Archive
 Francis Hodgson, "David Bailey: Still troubling after all these years"

1938 births
Living people
Commanders of the Order of the British Empire
Photographers from London
Fashion photographers
People from East Ham
British portrait photographers
English photographers
People with dyslexia
People with vascular dementia